Borj Sukhteh-ye Olya (also Romanized as Borj Sūkhteh-ye ‘Olyā; also known as Borj Sūkhteh and Borj Sūkhteh-ye Bālā) is a village in Anarestan Rural District, Chenar Shahijan District, Kazerun County, Fars Province, Iran. At the 2006 census, its population was 74, in 15 families.

References 

Populated places in Chenar Shahijan County